The Church of John the Baptist is an Armenian Apostolic church in Nesvetay village, Myasnikovsky District, Rostov Oblast, Russia. It is also officially declared as an architectural monument of regional significance of cultural heritage of Russia.

History 
Nesvetay village was founded in 1780, when thousands of Armenian families from Crimean peninsula were resettled in Don region on the decree of Catherine II. The Church of John the Baptist was first built here in 1790.

In 1837, one of Armenian merchants from Nakhichevan-on-Don petitioned to spiritual authorities to grant permission to build a new church in Nesvetay with his own funds, as the old had already been in dilipiated state. The permission was granted, and in spring of 1858 the construction was started. In 1866, Karapet Tonikyan, the merchant, died and willed to finish construction of the church. In 1867, Nesvetay parishioners petitioned the build another church using the remaining materials, for the constricting one, in their opinion, wasn't built in the style of Armenian architecture and wasn't situated in the right place. Yet they were denied and construction of the church was finished in 1870.

In 1930s the church came into dilipiated state as no one could grant money for its reconstruction. The church was closed. During World War II the building was hit by shelling several times.

In 1992, the church building was officially declared as an architectural monument of regional significance of cultural heritage of Russia. Today it still requires a reconstruction.

References

External links 
 John the Baptist Church in Armenian Encyclopedia

Literature 
(in Russian)
 Вартанян В.Г., Казаров С.С. Армянская-Апостольская Церковь на Дону // Ростов н/Д., 2001 Е.И.
 Халпахчьян О.X. Архитектура Нахичевани-на-Дону // Ер. 1988
 Шахазиз Е. Новый Нахичеван и новонахичеванцы / Перевод с армянского Ш. М. Шагиняна // Ростов-на-Дону, 1999
 Российская и Ново-Нахичеванская епархия Армянской Апостольской Церкви. Исторический путь. М., 2013

Churches in Rostov Oblast
Armenian Apostolic churches in Russia
Churches completed in 1870
Cultural heritage monuments of regional significance in Rostov Oblast